The Canadian Historical Aircraft Association is the former name of the Canadian Aviation Museum, a non-profit organization based in Windsor, Ontario which is committed to preserving aircraft which have significance to the history of Canadian aviation.  They have a 1941 Boeing Stearman, a 1952 Mark IV Harvard, a 1946 Fairchild 24R "Argus"  and two de Havilland Chipmunks available for special event fly-bys and donation flights.

The Canadian Aviation Museum is in charge of the maintenance and restoration of Lancaster FM212 which was purchased by the City of Windsor in 1964.  The Lancaster bomber was on display in Jackson Park for many years, and was transported to the Canadian Aviation Museum's restoration facilities at the Windsor Airport in order to protect it from the elements.

A Canadair Silver Star, more commonly known as a T-33, is on static display.  The CH2A is also building a de Havilland Mosquito bomber based on KB161, the first Canadian-built Mosquito bomber to enter WW2. Parts were recovered from a crash site at Pelly Lake and are being incorporated into the project. They are also restoring a Tiger Moth to flying condition. This aircraft once served in their hangar as a trainer at No.7 Elementary Flying Training School in the 1940s. Other restoration projects include a 1/2 scale Silver Dart and a functioning LINK Trainer.

The current President of the Canadian Aviation Museum is Don Christopher.

External links
http://www.canadianaviationmuseum.ca

Organizations based in Windsor, Ontario